Phosphorylase b kinase gamma catalytic chain, skeletal muscle isoform is an enzyme that in humans is encoded by the PHKG1 gene.

This gene is a member of the Ser/Thr protein kinase family and encodes a protein with one protein kinase domain and two calmodulin-binding domains. This protein is the catalytic member of a 16 subunit protein kinase complex which contains equimolar ratios of 4 subunit types. The complex is a crucial glycogenolytic regulatory enzyme. This gene has two pseudogenes at chromosome 7q11.21 and one at chromosome 11p11.12.

References

Further reading

EC 2.7.11